The Holy War on Ice refers to the college ice hockey series between Boston College and Notre Dame. Boston College is a member of the Hockey East conference, while Notre Dame is a member of the Big Ten for ice hockey. The two teams first met in 1969, predating the football rivalry from which the hockey series gets its name.

The teams play for the Lefty Smith – John "Snooks" Kelley Memorial Trophy.

History
The men's ice hockey series between the two schools originated in 1969, predating the football rivalry. Since Jerry York began his tenure as coach at BC in 1994, the series has been played regularly, receiving the moniker "Holy War on Ice," a reference to the football rivalry.

Boston College leads the all-time series 24–21–2, with the last meeting resulting in a 8–2 Fighting Irish victory on January 19, 2022 in South Bend.

The victor of the game between the Eagles and Irish is awarded the Lefty Smith – John "Snooks" Kelley Memorial Trophy, named for the teams' coaches when the series began in 1969.

In 2008, the two schools met in the 2008 Frozen Four final in Denver, CO, the first time the Eagles and Irish have met in the NCAA Tournament. Boston College skated to a 4–1 victory, claiming their third national championship and denying Notre Dame, a four-seed, the program's first.

Notre Dame briefly joined Boston College in Hockey East from 2013–14 to 2016–17. The two teams met twice annually during those four seasons, and their first contest as conference foes took place outdoors at Frozen Fenway in Boston, MA, where the Eagles skated to a 4–3 victory. They also met once in the postseason during the 2014 Hockey East Tournament. In that series, which was the first year of Notre Dame's league membership, the 8th seeded Irish defeated the top seeded Eagles in a best-of-three Quarterfinals at Chestnut Hill. 

While Notre Dame left Hockey East to join the Big Ten in 2017–18, the series continued with at least one game annually. 

Despite not meeting during the regular season of 2020–21 due to the COVID-19 pandemic preventing inter-conference games, the two teams seemed destined to meet regardless. The Eagles and Irish were slated to face each other in the first round of the 2021 NCAA tournament, playing in the Northeast regional at the Times Union Center, in Albany, New York. However, before the postseason meeting could happen, Notre Dame was forced to withdraw from the tournament due to positive COVID-19 tests among the team's personnel; the match was ruled a no-contest as the Eagles automatically advanced to the Regional Final.

The series resumed in 2022 after a two-season hiatus caused by the COVID-19 pandemic.

Game results

Series facts

See also
 Holy War (Boston College–Notre Dame)
 Boston College Eagles men's ice hockey
 Notre Dame Fighting Irish men's ice hockey

References

College ice hockey rivalries in the United States
Boston College Eagles men's ice hockey
Notre Dame Fighting Irish ice hockey